The Hawker Tomtit is a British training biplane from the late 1920s.

Design and development
The Royal Air Force in 1927 required a replacement for their current elementary trainers, the elderly Avro 504Ns. They specified that the power plant should be an Armstrong Siddeley Mongoose engine, a radial five-cylinder type, and the design should "have regards to the elimination of the Woodworking Fitter trades." In other words: the airframe, though not its covering had to be metal. This led Sydney Camm, then chief designer at Hawker to design the Tomtit, a single bay biplane whose frame was of steel and duralumin tubes. The spars were made of tubular dumbbell sections, the whole aircraft fabric covered. Automatic slats of the Handley Page type were fitted to the leading edges of the upper wing. It had the standard fixed main wheel and tail-skid undercarriage of its day. The engine was uncowled.

Instructor and trainee sat in open tandem cockpits. The latter, at the rear, was provided with the then-new blind flying panel and a cockpit hood was fitted so blind flying instruction was possible. The RAF Tomtits had 150 hp (112 kW) Mongoose IIIC motors. The prototype was first flown by George Bulman in November 1928.

Hawker also produced five civil registered Tomtits. The first two of these started with Mongoose IIIA engine and the third with an upright in-line 115 hp (86 kW) A.D.C. Cirrus Major. It was thought that this latter, lower power engine choice might appeal more to public sporting owners. Three of this group were later owned by Wolseley, who fitted them with their cowled A.R. 7 and A.R.9 radial motors.

Production and service

Between 1928 and 1931, 24 aircraft were delivered to the RAF for evaluation. After the first batch of ten, two more batches of six and eight aircraft respectively were ordered. The competition included the eventual winner, the Avro Tutor.  Military Tomtits were sold elsewhere, two to Canada and four to New Zealand. Despite its failure to win the RAF contract, it is probable that more Tomtits could have been sold as it was very well received by their pilots but Hawker were very busy  producing the Hawker Hart and its many variants and did not have the capacity to manufacture other aircraft.  The Cirrus powered machine had turned out to be rather underpowered and lacking the control precision of the standard aircraft.

In 1935 some nine ex-RAF aircraft joined the original five on the civil register. They were used by individuals and clubs as sports and training machines. On 4 February 1941, three surplus Tomtits were acquired from Leicester Aero Club by Alex Henshaw, the Chief Test Pilot at the Vickers Armstrong Castle Bromwich Aircraft Factory (VACBAF) for use as personal transport until mid-1942. G-AFIB was destroyed in a night take-off accident during the war and Henshaw sold the remaining aircraft in 1946. The third machine, G-AFVV was destroyed at some point soon after the war. One survived the war and was acquired and restored by Hawker in 1949. This was donated to the Shuttleworth Collection at Old Warden in 1960. G-AFTA is still operated by the Shuttleworth Collection.

Variants
Tomtit
 Two-seat training, club, sports and personal aircraft.
Tomtit Mk I
 Two-seat primary trainer for the RAF.

Military operators

 Royal Canadian Air Force - 2 aircraft.
 No. 7 Squadron RCAF
 No. 12 Squadron RCAF

 Royal New Zealand Air Force - 4 aircraft.
 Pilot Training School

 Royal Air Force - 24 aircraft.
 No. 24 Squadron RAF
 No. 3 Flying Training School
 Central Flying School

Survivors

One Tomtit still flies, the ex-RAF K1786 G-AFTA. This, the last RAF machine, completed in January 1931, initially served No. 3 Flying Training School. It joined the UK civil register in April 1939. During the war, it was flown by Alex Henshaw and gained a Spitfire windscreen and faired headrest. It was acquired and restored by Hawker in 1949 where it became the mount of their test pilot Neville Duke and was painted in the dark blue company colours. In 1960, it was handed over to the Shuttleworth Collection, who returned it to its original RAF colours in 1967.

Specifications (Tomtit)

References

Notes

Bibliography

 Jackson, J.J. British Civil Aircraft 1919–72: Volume II. London: Putnam and Company, 1973. 
 Mason, Francis K. Hawker Aircraft since 1920. London: Putnam & Company, 3rd revised edition 1991. .
 Thetford, Owen. Aircraft of the Royal Air Force 1919–57 1957. London: Putnam.
 Hannah, Donald. Hawker FlyPast Reference Library. Stamford, Lincolnshire, UK: Key Publishing Ltd., 1982. .
 James, Derek N. Hawker, an Aircraft Album No. 5. New York: Arco Publishing Company, 1973. . (First published in the UK by Ian Allan in 1972.)

External links

 British civil register
 Shuttleworth Collection, Hawker Tomtit 

1920s British military trainer aircraft
Tomtit
Biplanes
Single-engined tractor aircraft
Aircraft first flown in 1928